Xylota argoi is a species of hoverfly in the family Syrphidae.

Distribution
United States.

References

Eristalinae
Insects described in 1926
Diptera of North America
Hoverflies of North America
Taxa named by Raymond Corbett Shannon